Bowman Field  is a public airport located three miles (5 km) northeast of the central business district of Anaconda, a city in Deer Lodge County, Montana, United States. It is owned by Anaconda City and Deer Lodge County.

Facilities and aircraft 
For the 12-month period ending September 6, 2008, the airport had 4,900 aircraft operations, an average of 13 per day: 94% general aviation and 6% air taxi.

References

External links 

Airports in Montana
Buildings and structures in Deer Lodge County, Montana
Transportation in Deer Lodge County, Montana